The Ancient Beringian (AB) is a specific archaeogenetic lineage, based on the genome of an infant found at the Upward Sun River site (dubbed USR1), dated to 11,500 years ago. The AB lineage diverged from the Ancestral Native American (ANA) lineage about 20,000 years ago. The ANA lineage was estimated as having been formed between 20,000 and 25,000 years ago by a mixture of East Asian and Ancient North Eurasian lineages, consistent with the model of the peopling of the Americas via Beringia during the Last Glacial Maximum.

Research
The Ancient Beringian lineage is extinct, and is not found as a contribution to modern indigenous lineages in Alaska. The 2018 study suggests that the AB lineage was replaced by or absorbed in a back-migration of NNA (see below) to Alaska. The modern Athabaskan populations are derived from an admixture of this NNA back-migration and a Paleo-Siberian (Early Paleo-Eskimo) lineage before about 2,500 years ago.

The discovery was made from archaeogenetic analyses on the remains of two female infants discovered in 2013 at the Upward Sun River site (USR). The USR site is affiliated with the Denali Complex, a dispersed archaeological culture of the American Arctic. The genomic analysis of nuclear DNA of the older of the two infants (USR1) was done at the Centre for Geogenetics at the University of Copenhagen's Natural History Museum of Denmark. Results from the team's genetic analysis were published in January 2018 in the scientific journal Nature. The analysis compared the infant's genomes with both ancient and contemporary genomes. The results suggested that the pre-"Ancestral Native American" lineage derived from the East Asian lineage after 36 kya, with gene flow until about 25 kya. During 25–20 kya, this lineage was substantially mixed with the Ancient North Eurasian lineage, to form the "Ancestral Native American" lineage by 20 kya. The "Ancient Beringian" (AB) lineage derived from ANA and persisted without significant admixture in Alaska until the time of USR1, some 8,000 years later. The lineage of other Paleo-Indians diverged from AB at ca. 20–18 kya, and further divided into "North Native American" (NNA) and "South Native American" lineages between 17.5 kya and 14.6 kya, reflecting the dispersal associated with the early peopling of the Americas.

See also
 Alaska Natives
 Na-Dené languages
 Genetic history of indigenous peoples of the Americas
 Settlement of the Americas
 Upward Sun River site

References

Sources

External links

Beringia
AB
Pleistocene North America
Peopling of the Americas
Prehistory of the Arctic
Oldest human remains in the Americas
Paleo-Indian period
Native American history of Alaska